

 
Douglas-Daly is a locality in the Northern Territory of Australia located about  south of the territory capital of Darwin.

Douglas-Daly consists of land associated with the catchments of the Daly and the Douglas Rivers and which is located between the towns of Adelaide River and Pine Creek and to the respective south and west of these towns.  The Daly River forms part of the locality's boundary on its south-western side while the alignment of the Adelaide-Darwin Railway coincides in places with its north-eastern boundary.  It is named after the Daly and Douglas Rivers.  The term Douglas-Daly is reported by the official source as being widely used locally.  Its boundaries and name were gazetted on 4 April 2007.

The 2016 Australian census which was conducted in August 2016 reports that Douglas-Daly and the locality of Fleming shared a population of 238 people.

Douglas-Daly is located within the federal division of Lingiari, the territory electoral division of Daly and partly within the local government area of the Victoria Daly Region and partly within the unincorporated areas of the Northern Territory.

Heritage places
Douglas-Daly includes the following places which have added to the Northern Territory Heritage Register:
Brocks Creek Township, Railway Siding & Military Detention Barracks
Brocks Creek Chinatown and Temple Site
WWII Fenton Airfield
12 Mile Chinatown (Settlement and Battery)
Burrundie Explosives Magazines
Grove Hill Hotel
Cypress Pine Overland Telegraph Poles (via Pine Creek)
Spring Hill Battery Complex
Brocks Creek Cemetery
Butterfly Gorge
WWII B24-D Liberator 'Nothing Sacred'
The Shackle

References

Notes

Citations

Populated places in the Northern Territory
Victoria Daly Region
Places in the unincorporated areas of the Northern Territory